, also known as , is a Japanese manga series by Nagano. It has been serialized online via Twitter since January 2020 and has been collected in five tankōbon volumes by Kodansha. An anime television series adaptation by Doga Kobo premiered in April 2022.

Characters

Media

Manga

Anime
An anime adaptation by Doga Kobo was announced on October 28, 2021.  The television series is directed by Takenori Mihara, with Yuma Yamaguchi composing the music.  It premiered on April 4, 2022, on Fuji TV's Mezamashi TV morning news and entertainment program. Sentai Filmworks licensed the series outside of Asia.

Episode list

Notes

References

External links
  
 

Anime series based on manga
Comics about mammals
Doga Kobo
Fuji TV original programming
Japanese webcomics
Kodansha manga
Seinen manga
Sentai Filmworks
Slice of life anime and manga
Webcomics in print